Julien Manzano (8 April 1937 – 3 March 2023) was a French professional football player and coach.

Career
Born in Saint-Denis, Manzano played for Red Star, Forbach and Boulogne.

Manzano later managed Dreux and Créteil.

References

1937 births
2023 deaths
French footballers
Red Star F.C. players
US Forbach players
US Boulogne players
Ligue 2 players
Ligue 1 players
French football managers
US Créteil-Lusitanos managers